El Alamein International Airport  (Arabic:  Maṭār El ʿAlamein El Dawli) is an international airport located in El Dabaa, Matrouh Governorate, Egypt.

Operations

Overview

El Alamein International Airport is owned and operated by International Airports Company which is KATO investment subsidiary. On 1999 a bid for build–operate–transfer (BOT), was won by International Airport Company of 50-year extendable concession.

Runways
El Alamein International Airport has a single runway , suitable for A380-800 operations.

Airlines and destinations 
As of August 2021, there are no scheduled flights to the airport.

See also
 List of airports in Egypt
 Transport in Egypt

References

External links 
 
 

Airports in Egypt
Transport in Egypt